Columbus Country Club is a country club located in Columbus, Ohio. The golf course at the club hosted the PGA Championship in 1964, which Bobby Nichols won.

References

External links
Official site

Buildings and structures in Columbus, Ohio
Golf clubs and courses in Ohio
Sports venues in Columbus, Ohio
Sports venues completed in 1907
1907 establishments in Ohio